, colloquially also known as , is a Japanese media franchise primarily focused on video games, with branches into other media such as manga, anime, light novels and audio dramas. Though no game in the franchise has been released outside Japan, an anime based thereupon and two related games – Tokyo Twilight Ghost Hunters and Kowloon High-School Chronicle – have.

The franchise began June 16, 1998 with the release of the PlayStation game Tokyo Majin Gakuen: Kenpūchō. Beyond the franchise itself, there are also several video games considered linked to it through style, setting, or systems. Coined by series director Shuuhou Imai (今井秋芳), the franchise, its broader sphere of related works, and their unifying style are collectively known as  – i.e., entries all center on students fighting the supernatural (typically demonic creatures from Japanese folklore and Shinto). This moniker – Gakuen Juvenile Denki – has also occasionally been used as a "series name", both officially and by third parties, for some of these related works led by Imai.

Video games 
Many video games have been released in or adjacent to the Tokyo Majin Gakuen Denki franchise, connected not only in name, but often in themes and systems as well. Nearly all of the games present their narrative through visual novel-like story segments, while the non-expository gameplay segments vary considerably in nature.

Perhaps the most iconic idiosyncrasy that unites most all titles under the wider Tokyo Majin Gakuen Denki umbrella is the so-called . During  story segments, the game will occasionally prompt the player for a directional input into a cross-like interface. Each vertex of the cross corresponds to an emotion (or, in some cases, one of the five senses), and depending on the player's choice (inaction is also an option), their relationship with the character being spoken to may improve, worsen, or remain unchanged. Through this method, the player may gain (or fail to gain) extra party members, access (or irreversibly miss) special story scenes, or affect which ending they eventually reach. The system has been upheld as unique and distinctive of the franchise, as well as criticized as too obtuse.

Main series 
The games in the main series share gameplay consisting of a mix of the aforementioned visual novel-like story segments, and of tactical RPG battles. The characters are students who must do battle with demonic creatures based in Japanese folk lore and Shinto. Between battles are visual novel-style story segments, in which the player nurtures the relationships between the protagonist and various characters.

Excluding remakes and expansions, only two main games have been released, with a third having been announced but ultimately canceled.

Spin-offs

Related 
A number of games not officially part of the franchise, but which are considered linked to it through systems, setting, or Shuuhou Imai's influence, have also been released. Kowloon High-School Chronicle and Tokyo Twilight Ghost Hunters were directed by Imai. The Tenshō Gakuen series, Kamiyo Gakuen, and Tokyo Mono Hara Shi, however, borrow systems and themes from Tokyo Majin Gakuen Denki (and, in the latter case, Kowloon High-School Chronicle), but share little to no production staff with the franchise.

Anime 

In 2007, the anime  was broadcast in Japan. The same year, it was localized into English by ADV Films, becoming the franchise's first entry to be released outside Japan. It is a loose adaptation of the first game, Kenpūchō, though due to the absence of creative influence from series director Shuuhou Imai, it significantly differs from the original work.

Other media 
In a media mix marketing strategy, tangential works in other media have also been produced. This includes:

 The audio dramas Taimajin (退魔陣), Gekkōden (月紅伝), Kōryūsai (黄龍祭), Yōkitan (妖鬼譚), and Kagerō (陽炎). In addition, audio dramas based on Kowloon High-School Chronicle, Tenshō Gakuen: Gensōroku, Tenshō Gakuen: Gekkōroku, Tokyo Mono Hara Shi, and Tokyo Requiem have been released, as well as one only available with the Japanese limited edition of the Nintendo Switch version of Kowloon High-School Chronicle.
 The radio dramas , based on the anime, and  – the latter being web radio, later collected on DVD.
 The manga Tokyo Requiem.
 The light novel series Sōryūhen (双龍変). In addition, a light novel based on Tokyo Twilight Ghost Hunters: Daybreak Special Gigs has been released.

References 

Tokyo Majin Gakuen Denki
Mass media franchises
Odex
Video game franchises
Video game franchises introduced in 1998
Marvelous Entertainment franchises